Kabuliwala is a 1961 Hindi film based on the 1892 short story "Kabuliwala", by the Bengali writer Rabindranath Tagore. It was directed by Hemen Gupta and starred Balraj Sahni, Usha Kiran, Sajjan, Sonu and Baby Farida.

Cast
 Balraj Sahni as Abdul Rehman Khan
 Sonu as Mini
 Usha Kiran as Rama, Mini's mother
 Padma
 Laxmi
 Sarita Devi
 Anwari Bai
 Leela Agha
 Baby Farida
 Asit Sen as Bhola

Background
Gupta had remained private secretary to Subhas Chandra Bose, and went on to direct many films including Taksaal (1956), also starring Balraj Sahni, and his tribute Netaji Subhas Chandra Bose (1966).

Soundtrack
Music –  Salil Choudhury; Lyrics – Prem Dhawan, Gulzar

 "Aye Mere Pyaare Watan" – Manna Dey ,Lyrics by Prem Dhawan
 "Ganga Aaye Kahan Se" – Hemant Kumar
 "Kabuliwala" – Hemant Kumar, Usha Mangeshkar
 "O Ya Qurbaan" – Mohammed Rafi

References

External links
 
 

1960s Hindi-language films
1961 films
Films set in Kolkata
Films based on works by Rabindranath Tagore
Films based on short fiction
Films scored by Salil Chowdhury
Films directed by Hemen Gupta